The Marvel Cinematic Universe (MCU) is an American media franchise and shared universe centered on a series of superhero films, independently produced by Marvel Studios and based on characters that appear in American comic books published by Marvel Comics. The franchise also includes comic books, short films, television series, and digital series. The shared universe, much like the original Marvel Universe in comic books, was established by crossing over common plot elements, settings, cast, and characters.

Of the various science fiction awards, the Saturn Awards is the most frequent award for the Marvel Cinematic Universe; in 13 years, MCU films have been nominated for 159 Saturn Awards (winning 39): 8 nominations for Iron Man (winning three), 1 nomination for The Incredible Hulk, 4 nominations for Iron Man 2, 4 nominations for Thor (winning one), 7 nominations for Captain America: The First Avenger, 6 nominations for The Avengers (winning four), 5 nominations for Iron Man 3 (winning three), 5 nominations for Thor: The Dark World, 11 nominations for Captain America: The Winter Soldier, 9 nominations for Guardians of the Galaxy (winning four), 4 nominations for Avengers: Age of Ultron (winning one), 6 nominations for Ant-Man (winning one), 8 nominations for Captain America: Civil War (winning one), 10 nominations for Doctor Strange (winning two), 4 nominations for Guardians of the Galaxy Vol. 2 (winning one), 4 nominations for Spider-Man: Homecoming (winning one), 2 nominations for Thor: Ragnarok, 14 nominations for Black Panther (winning five), 2 nominations for Avengers: Infinity War (winning one), 3 nominations for Captain Marvel, 14 nominations for Avengers: Endgame (winning six), 4 nominations for Spider-Man: Far From Home (winning two), 7 nominations for Shang-Chi and the Legend of the Ten Rings (winning one), 1 nomination for Eternals, 9 nominations for Spider-Man: No Way Home (winning one), 4 nominations for Doctor Strange in the Multiverse of Madness (winning one), and 3 nominations for Thor: Love and Thunder. It also holds the record for most nominations (and second for most wins after Star Wars) for Saturn Awards for a film franchise.

The Marvel Cinematic Universe is also distinguished by the fact that Black Panther was the first superhero film and MCU film to be nominated for an Academy Award for Best Picture and a Golden Globe Awards for Best Motion Picture and first to win an Academy Award. In addition, Iron Man was inducted into the National Film Registry in 2022.

MCU films have also been nominated for 12 Hugo Awards, winning two for The Avengers and Guardians of the Galaxy.

Academy Awards

Golden Globe Awards

BAFTA Awards

Grammy Award

Saturn Awards

Hugo Award

MTV Movie & TV Awards

Visual Effects Society Awards

References

External links

Phase One films

Phase Two films

Phase Three films

Phase Four films
 
 
 
 
 
 
 

Lists of accolades by film series
Lists of accolades by franchises
Awards and nominations by films